The following is a list of the 62 schools that are fielding men's ice hockey teams in NCAA Division I in the current 2022–23 season, plus the 42 schools that are fielding women's teams in the de facto equivalent of Division I, the NCAA's National Collegiate division.

Conference affiliations reflect those in place for the 2022–23 season.

Men

Notes

 The NCAA began sponsoring ice hockey in the 1947–48 season.  All teams before 1956, and those classified in the 'University Division' from 1956–1972 are retroactively considered Division I.
 Bemidji State also competed in Division I from 1947–1950 and 1959–1967.
 Bemidji State won Division II National Championships in 1984, 1993, 1994, 1995, and 1997, and a Division III Championship in 1986.
 UMass also competed in Division I from 1947–1961.
 UMass Lowell won Division II National Championships in 1979, 1981, and 1982.
 Merrimack won a Division II National Championship in 1978.
 Minnesota State won a Division II National Championship in 1980.
 RIT won a Division II National Championship in 1983 and a Division III Championship in 1985.
 Union also competed in Division I from 1947–1949.

Map
The below maps show the locations of teams that have won the championship; the color of the dot indicates the number of titles.

Future teams

Women

Notes

Future teams

See also 
List of NCAA Division II ice hockey programs
List of NCAA Division III ice hockey programs
List of defunct men's college ice hockey teams
List of NCAA Division I institutions
List of NCAA Division I baseball programs
List of NCAA fencing schools
List of NCAA Division I FBS football programs
List of NCAA Division I FCS football programs
List of NCAA Division I lacrosse programs
List of college swimming and diving teams
List of NCAA Division I ice hockey arenas

Footnotes

References

External links
USCHO men's team list
USCHO women's team list

 
Hockey
Division I Programs